Sandia Province is a province of the Puno Region in Peru. The capital of the province is the city of Sandia.

Geography 
The Apolobamba mountain range traverses the province. Some of the highest mountains of the province are listed below:

Political division 
The province measures  and is divided into ten districts:

Ethnic groups 
The people in the province are mainly indigenous citizens of Aymara and Quechua descent. Quechua is the language which the majority of the population (53.86%) learnt to speak in childhood, 35.51% of the residents started speaking using the Spanish language and  10.49% using Aymara (2007 Peru Census).

See also 
 Mawk'allaqta
 Quchak'uchu
 Qulu Qulu

References

External links
  www.munisandia.gob.pe Official province web site

Provinces of the Puno Region